The 2015 Pine Bowl is a college football bowl game that was played on Sunday, November 15, 2015 at Yurtec Stadium Sendai in Sendai in Japan.  The 28th annual Pine Bowl had Hokkaido University representing the Hokkaido American Football Association and Tohoku University representing the Tohoku Collegiate American Football Association. Tohoku won by a score of 17-0.

References

External links

Pine Bowl (game)
2015 in Japanese sport
2015 in American football